Events from the year 1581 in India.

Events
 Francisco de Mascarenhas becomes 13th Vice Regent of Portuguese India (until 1584)

Births

Deaths
 September 1, Guru Ram Das, the fourth of the ten gurus of Sikhism dies in Goindval (born 1534)

See also

 Timeline of Indian history